Gunnar Thoresen (October 10, 1921 – May 18, 1972) was a Norwegian bobsledder who competed in the late 1940s and early 1950s. Competing in two Winter Olympics, he earned his best finish of tenth in the four-man event at Oslo in 1952.

References
1948 bobsleigh two-man results
1948 bobsleigh four-man results
1952 bobsleigh four-man results
Gunnar Thoreson's profile at Sports Reference.com

1921 births
1972 deaths
Olympic bobsledders of Norway
Bobsledders at the 1948 Winter Olympics
Bobsledders at the 1952 Winter Olympics
Norwegian male bobsledders